{{DISPLAYTITLE:C17H17Cl2NO}}
The molecular formula C17H17Cl2NO (molar mass: 322.229 g/mol, exact mass: 321.0687 u) may refer to:

 Diclofensine
 Fengabine (SL-79,229)

Molecular formulas